Mahlon Dickerson Manson (February 20, 1820 – February 4, 1895) was a druggist, Indiana politician, and a Union general in the American Civil War.

Biography
Manson was born in Piqua, Ohio, to David Manson, Jr., and Sarah Cornwall. He was a descendant of David Manson, an aide to Revolutionary War General George Washington. His family moved to Crawfordsville, Indiana. He was a school teacher in Montgomery County, Indiana. He studied medicine in Cincinnati, Ohio, and gave medical lectures in New Orleans. During the Mexican–American War he served with the 5th Indiana Volunteers as a captain. He was a druggist in Crawfordsville, Indiana, and a member of the Indiana Legislature.

At the beginning of the Civil War, he was appointed a captain in the 10th Indiana Infantry and was promoted to colonel in less than a month. He commanded a brigade in the Army of the Ohio at the Battle of Mill Springs in 1862 and was promoted to brigadier general on March 24, 1862, based on his actions there. General Manson was wounded in the thigh and captured by Confederate forces at the Battle of Richmond, Kentucky. He was exchanged two months later and fought Morgan on his raid into Ohio. In the span of two months, Manson advanced from brigade, to division and then to command the XXIII Corps. He led the corps during the Knoxville Campaign seeing action at Campbell's Station and Knoxville. General Manson returned to brigade command, in the Army of the Ohio, during the Atlanta Campaign and was seriously wounded in the Battle of Resaca, Georgia.

After the war, he served in the United States House of Representatives as a Democrat from 1871 to 1873, was state auditor, and the 20th Lieutenant Governor of Indiana from 1885–1886.

Manson died in Frankfort, Indiana, and is buried in Oak Hill Cemetery, Crawfordsville.

See also

List of American Civil War generals (Union)

References
 Eicher, John H., and Eicher, David J., Civil War High Commands, Stanford University Press, 2001, .
 Lambert, D. Warren, When the Ripe Pears Fell, The Battle of Richmond, Kentucky, Madison County Historical Society, 1996, .
 Perry, Oran, Adjutant-General, Indiana in the Mexican War, Indianapolis, 1908.
 Warner, Ezra J., Generals in Blue: Lives of the Union Commanders, Louisiana State University Press, 1964, .

External links
Congressional biography
Civil War in Indiana

1820 births
1895 deaths
People of Indiana in the American Civil War
Lieutenant Governors of Indiana
People of Ohio in the American Civil War
People from Piqua, Ohio
American military personnel of the Mexican–American War
Union Army generals
Indiana State Auditors
Indiana Republicans
People from Indiana in the Mexican–American War
Democratic Party members of the United States House of Representatives from Indiana
People from Crawfordsville, Indiana
19th-century American politicians
United States Army officers